My Best Part is a 2020 French comedy-drama film, directed by Nicolas Maury. The film stars Maury as Jérémie, an actor who moves back home to live with his mother Bernadette (Nathalie Baye) after setbacks in his career and his romantic life with his boyfriend Albert (Arnaud Valois).

The film was named as an official selection of the 2020 Cannes Film Festival, although it was not screened at that time due to the COVID-19 pandemic in France; it instead had its theatrical premiere on August 28 at the Angoulême Film Festival. It was screened for distributors in the Industry Selects program at the 2020 Toronto International Film Festival, and had its commercial premiere on October 28.

Cast 
 Nicolas Maury as Jérémie Meyer
 Nathalie Baye as Bernadette Meyer
 Arnaud Valois as Albert
 Théo Christine as Kévin
 Laure Calamy as Sylvie
 Jean-Marc Barr as The director
 Laurent Capelluto as Jean-François
 Carole Franck

References

External links
 

2020 films
2020 LGBT-related films
French comedy-drama films
French LGBT-related films
LGBT-related comedy-drama films
2020 comedy-drama films
2020s French-language films
2020s French films